Anaxipha  is a genus of brown sword-tail cricket from tropical areas in the Americas, Africa, Asia, Australia and western Pacific islands.

Species

Anaxipha adventicia Otte, 2006
Anaxipha agaea Otte, 2006
Anaxipha ainigma Otte & Perez-Gelabert, 2009
Anaxipha allardi Chopard, 1956
Anaxipha allotria Otte, 2006
Anaxipha amica Otte & Perez-Gelabert, 2009
Anaxipha angusticollis (Saussure, 1874)
Anaxipha annulipes Hebard, 1924
Anaxipha antictypos Otte & Perez-Gelabert, 2009
Anaxipha antidupos Otte & Perez-Gelabert, 2009
Anaxipha aphaura Otte & Perez-Gelabert, 2009
Anaxipha apseudes Otte & Perez-Gelabert, 2009
Anaxipha arena Otte & Perez-Gelabert, 2009
Anaxipha armstrongi Chopard, 1929
Anaxipha athanes Otte & Perez-Gelabert, 2009
Anaxipha atrifrons (Bruner, 1916)
Anaxipha beccarii Salfi, 1935
Anaxipha bicoloripes Chopard, 1954
Anaxipha bifasciata Chopard, 1927
Anaxipha biroi Chopard, 1927
Anaxipha bradephona Desutter-Grandcolas, 2000
Anaxipha bredoi Chopard, 1948
Anaxipha brevipennis Chopard, 1957
Anaxipha brevis Chopard, 1958
Anaxipha bryani Chopard, 1929
Anaxipha buxtoni Chopard, 1929
Anaxipha caicos Otte & Perez-Gelabert, 2009
Anaxipha caledonica Otte, 1987
Anaxipha calusa Walker & Funk, 2014
Anaxipha cayennensis (Saussure, 1897)
Anaxipha championi (Saussure, 1897)
Anaxipha charitopis Otte & Perez-Gelabert, 2009
Anaxipha chichimeca (Saussure, 1878)
Anaxipha ciliata (Afzelius & Brannius, 1804)
Anaxipha concolor (Chopard, 1917)
Anaxipha conomeru Otte & Perez-Gelabert, 2009
Anaxipha conspersa (Bruner, 1916)
Anaxipha contaminata (Karsch, 1893)
Anaxipha copo Otte & Perez-Gelabert, 2009
Anaxipha cregyos Otte & Perez-Gelabert, 2009
Anaxipha daktrilla Otte & Perez-Gelabert, 2009
Anaxipha dapsiles Otte, 2006
Anaxipha delicatula (Scudder, 1878)
Anaxipha desjardinsii (Serville, 1838)
Anaxipha dimidiatipes (Bolívar, 1910)
Anaxipha dolomedes Otte & Perez-Gelabert, 2009
Anaxipha eminens Otte & Perez-Gelabert, 2009
Anaxipha endoxos Otte & Perez-Gelabert, 2009
Anaxipha eperatos Otte & Perez-Gelabert, 2009
Anaxipha epicydes Otte, 2006
Anaxipha esau Rehn, 1918
Anaxipha euclastos Otte & Perez-Gelabert, 2009
Anaxipha exagistos Otte, 2006
Anaxipha exigua (Say, 1825)
Anaxipha festina Otte & Perez-Gelabert, 2009
Anaxipha fistulator Rehn, 1918
Anaxipha fragilis Hebard, 1924
Anaxipha fultoni Walker & Funk, 2014
Anaxipha furtiva Otte & Perez-Gelabert, 2009
Anaxipha furva (Karsch, 1893)
Anaxipha fuscocinctum (Chopard, 1925)
Anaxipha gilva (Karsch, 1893)
Anaxipha gracilis (Scudder, 1869)
Anaxipha grandis Chopard, 1968
Anaxipha gueinzii (Kirby, 1906)
Anaxipha henryi Chopard, 1936
Anaxipha hirsuta Hebard, 1928
Anaxipha hyalodes Otte, 2006
Anaxipha hypaerios Otte, 2006
Anaxipha hypergios Otte, 2006
Anaxipha hypsipetes Otte & Perez-Gelabert, 2009
Anaxipha imitator (Saussure, 1878)
Anaxipha incompta (Walker, 1869)
Anaxipha infirmenotata Chopard, 1956
Anaxipha insularis (Walker, 1869)
Anaxipha karschi (Karny, 1907)
Anaxipha kilimandjarica Sjöstedt, 1910
Anaxipha laepseros Otte, 2006
Anaxipha laevithorax Chopard, 1927
Anaxipha lanceolata (Walker, 1869)
Anaxipha latefasciata Chopard, 1956
Anaxipha lathrios Otte & Perez-Gelabert, 2009
Anaxipha latipennis (Walker, 1869)
Anaxipha lineatocollis (Serville, 1838)
Anaxipha litarena Fulton, 1956
Anaxipha longealata Chopard, 1930
Anaxipha lucia Otte & Perez-Gelabert, 2009
Anaxipha maculifemur Chopard, 1926
Anaxipha maculifrons Chopard, 1937
Anaxipha maculipes Chopard, 1929
Anaxipha marginipennis Chopard, 1954
Anaxipha maritima (Saussure, 1878)
Anaxipha maxima (Bruner, 1916)
Anaxipha minuta (Linnaeus, 1767)
Anaxipha mjobergi Chopard, 1925
Anaxipha musica (Saussure, 1878)
Anaxipha natalensis Chopard, 1955
Anaxipha nava Otte, 2006
Anaxipha negrila Otte & Perez-Gelabert, 2009
Anaxipha nemobioides Chopard, 1925
Anaxipha nidaka Otte & Perez-Gelabert, 2009
Anaxipha nigerrima Chopard, 1956
Anaxipha nigrellus (Hebard, 1928)
Anaxipha nigrescens Chopard, 1934
Anaxipha nigripennis Chopard, 1956
Anaxipha nigrithorax Chopard, 1928
Anaxipha nimitata Otte & Perez-Gelabert, 2009
Anaxipha nitida (Chopard, 1912)
Anaxipha obscuripennis (Chopard, 1930)
Anaxipha olmeca (Saussure, 1897)
Anaxipha ornata Chopard, 1938
Anaxipha othnia Otte, 2006
Anaxipha pallens (Stål, 1861)
Anaxipha papuana Chopard, 1951
Anaxipha paraensis Rehn, 1918
Anaxipha peregrina Otte, 2006
Anaxipha peruviana (Saussure, 1874)
Anaxipha philifolia Rentz, 1973
Anaxipha phoxi Otte & Perez-Gelabert, 2009
Anaxipha pictipennis Hebard, 1924
Anaxipha platyptera Hebard, 1928
Anaxipha praepostera Otte, 2006
Anaxipha prosenes Otte, 2006
Anaxipha pteticos Otte, 2006
Anaxipha pulchra Roy, 1965
Anaxipha pulicaria (Burmeister, 1838)
Anaxipha rico Otte & Perez-Gelabert, 2009
Anaxipha rosamacula Walker & Funk, 2014
Anaxipha ruficeps Chopard, 1956
Anaxipha rufoguttata Chopard, 1954
Anaxipha schunkei Chopard, 1956
Anaxipha scia Hebard, 1915
Anaxipha scitula (Saussure, 1878)
Anaxipha simulacrum Rehn, 1918
Anaxipha sinktrilla Otte & Perez-Gelabert, 2009
Anaxipha sirico Otte & Perez-Gelabert, 2009
Anaxipha sjostedti Chopard, 1968
Anaxipha slotinka Otte & Perez-Gelabert, 2009
Anaxipha smithi (Saussure, 1897)
Anaxipha soror Chopard, 1956
Anaxipha stolzmannii (Bolívar, 1881)
Anaxipha stramenticia Rehn, 1918
Anaxipha straminea (Saussure, 1878)
Anaxipha tachephona Desutter-Grandcolas, 2000
Anaxipha tamucu Otte & Perez-Gelabert, 2009
Anaxipha tatei Hebard, 1924
Anaxipha tetyenna Otte & Alexander, 1983
Anaxipha thomasi Walker & Funk, 2014
Anaxipha tinnula Walker & Funk, 2014
Anaxipha tinnulacita Walker & Funk, 2014
Anaxipha tinnulenta Walker & Funk, 2014
Anaxipha titschacki Chopard, 1954
Anaxipha tooronga Otte & Alexander, 1983
Anaxipha trigonidioides Chopard, 1962
Anaxipha tripuraensis Shishodia & Tandon, 1990
Anaxipha tychicos Otte, 2006
Anaxipha uato Otte & Perez-Gelabert, 2009
Anaxipha unicolor (Scudder, 1869)
Anaxipha vadschaggae (Sjöstedt, 1910)
Anaxipha valida (Bolívar, 1910)
Anaxipha variegata (Chopard, 1912)
Anaxipha vera Otte, 2006
Anaxipha vernalis Walker & Funk, 2014
Anaxipha vicina Chopard, 1925
Anaxipha vigilax Otte & Perez-Gelabert, 2009
Anaxipha vittata (Bolívar, 1888)
Anaxipha vivax Otte & Perez-Gelabert, 2009
Anaxipha volucer Otte, 2006
Anaxipha woodruffi Otte & Perez-Gelabert, 2009
Anaxipha yakuno Otte & Perez-Gelabert, 2009
Anaxipha zebra Otte & Perez-Gelabert, 2009

Fossil Species

Anaxipha †dominica Vickery & Poinar, 1994

References

Crickets
Ensifera genera